Ieronymos II (born 10 March 1938) is the Archbishop of Athens and All Greece and as such the primate of the Autocephalous Orthodox Church of Greece. He was elected on 7 February 2008.

Ieronymos served as Protosyncellus of the Metropolis of Thebes and Livadeia, abbot of the monasteries of the Transfiguration of Sagmata and Hosios Loukas, and Secretary, later Archsecretary, of the Holy Synod of the Church of Greece. In 1981 he was elected Metropolitan Bishop of Thebes and Levadeia. He published two major textbooks: "Medieval Monuments of Euboea" (1970), and "Christian Boeotia" (2006).

On 7 February 2008, Ieronymos was elected the new Archbishop of Athens and All Greece by the Holy Synod of the Church of Greece, He formally took office on 16 February 2008.

Early life and background
Ieronymos was born in Oinofyta, Boeotia and is of Arvanite descent.

Ieronymos holds degrees in archaeology, Byzantine studies, and theology from the University of Athens. He has undertaken postgraduate studies at the University of Graz, the University of Regensburg and the University of Munich. 

Following a stint as lector in Christian archaeology at the Athens Archaeological Society under professor Anastasios Orlandos, he taught as a philologist in Lycée Léonin and he was ordained deacon and then presbyter in the Orthodox Church in 1967.

Titles

The official title of the Archbishop of Athens and All Greece is:

His Beatitude Ieronymos II, Archbishop of Athens and All Greece;

in Greek:

 Η Αυτού Μακαριότης ο Αρχιεπίσκοπος Αθηνών και Πάσης Ελλάδος Ιερώνυμος Β'

Ecclesiastical affairs
Ieronymos served as Protosyncellus of the Metropolis of Thebes and Livadeia, abbot of the monasteries of the Transfiguration of Sagmata and Hosios Loukas, and Secretary, later Archsecretary, of the Holy Synod of the Church of Greece. In 1981 he was elected Metropolitan Bishop of Thebes and Levadeia. In addition to his pastoral ministry, Ieronymos has been pursuing his work on Christian archaeology and has published two major textbooks: "Medieval Monuments of Euboea" (1970), and "Christian Boeotia" (2006). In 1998, he unsuccessfully contested the election to the throne of the archbishopric of Athens.

On 7 February 2008, Ieronymos was elected the new Archbishop of Athens and All Greece by the Holy Synod of the Church of Greece, receiving 45 out of 74 votes in a two-ballot process. He formally took office on 16 February 2008.

As of 2016, Ieronymos, is involved in a dispute with Patriarch Bartholomew I of Constantinople over who has ecclesiastical authority over certain parts of Greece.

Social and political views

In 2012, Ieronymos criticized racism, antisemitism, Islamophobia and the Golden Dawn party, saying that "The church loves all people, including those who are black, white or non-Christians."

On 16 April 2016, he visited, together with Pope Francis and Bartholomew I of Constantinople, the Mòria camp in the island of Lesbos, to call the attention of the world to the refugee crisis.

Notes and references

Bintliff, John (2003), "The Ethnoarchaeology of a "Passive" Ethnicity: The Arvanites of Central Greece" in K.S. Brown and Yannis Hamilakis, eds., The Usable Past: Greek Metahistories, Lexington Books. .

External links

Archdiocese of Athens Official website 

|-

1937 births
Living people
People from Boeotia
Arvanites
National and Kapodistrian University of Athens alumni
University of Graz alumni
University of Regensburg alumni
Ludwig Maximilian University of Munich alumni
Archbishops of Athens and All Greece
Eastern Orthodox Christians from Greece
21st-century Eastern Orthodox archbishops
Eastern Orthodox theologians
20th-century Eastern Orthodox bishops
Bishops of Thebes, Greece
20th-century Greek historians
Recipients of the Order of Prince Yaroslav the Wise, 3rd class
Recipients of the Order of Prince Yaroslav the Wise, 1st class
21st-century Greek historians